"That's What You Do to Me" is a song written by Johnny MacRae and Bob Morrison, and recorded by American country music artist Charly McClain.  It was released in August 1978 as the third single from her album Let Me Be Your Baby.  The song peaked at number 8 on the Billboard Hot Country Singles chart. It also reached number 1 on the RPM Country Tracks chart in Canada.

Chart performance

References

1978 singles
Charly McClain songs
Epic Records singles
1978 songs
Songs written by Johnny MacRae
Songs written by Bob Morrison (songwriter)